Worship the Glitch is the only full-length album to be released by "ELpH vs. Coil", though an EP called Born Again Pagans is credited to "Coil vs. ELpH". ELpH is the name that Coil used to describe the random musical compositions that were generated from their own equipment, either by itself or as an unintended yet pleasant byproduct of their own work; as a result, this album can essentially count as a Coil album.

Background
John Balance, Peter Christopherson and Drew McDowall are credited for creating Worship the Glitch. "Mono" is a cover version of Nancy Sinatra's "Bang Bang (My Baby Shot Me Down)", consisting of a heavily processed guitar solo.

The first 500 copies of the CD were a special edition, which included a reflective cover. The 2X10" vinyl format was released in an edition of 2,000 numbered copies. There were also forty copies released with handmade covers by Jhonn Balance; some painted and some assembled by collage, each signed and given a unique title. The vinyl version uses slightly different track indexing than its CD counterpart.

The vinyl has the following etchings:
 Side A: IT NEVER HURTS...
 Side B: UNLESS YOU CATCH YOUR FINGER IN IT.
 Side C: ∞ TRANSMITTER
 Side D: AUM GENERATOR

Track listing

CD version
 "Dark Start" – 4:12
 "Opium Hum" – 2:37
 "Caged Birds" – 1:33
 "The Halliwell Hammers" – 2:39
 "Clorax Hurd" – 3:00
 "The Halliwell Hammers (2)" – 3:43
 "We Have Always Been Here" – 6:11
 "Manunkind" – 1:23
 "Bism" – 4:58
 "Hydlepark" – 6:00
 "Hysteron Proteron Jewel" – 2:18
 "Decadent & Symmetrical" – 1:51
 "Mono" – 5:27
 "The Halliwell Hammers (3)" – 3:36
 "Anything That Flies" – 3:09
 "Ended" – 1:14

2X10" version
Side A
 "Dark Start" – 4:12
 "Opium Hum" – 2:37
 "Caged Birds" – 2:06
 "The Halliwell Hammers" – 2:04
 "Clorax Hurd" – 3:00
Side B
 "The Halliwell Hammers (2)" – 3:43
 "We Have Always Been Here" – 6:11
 "Manunkind" – 1:23
Side C
 "Bism" – 5:48
 "Hydlepark" – 5:05
 "Hysteron Proteron Jewel" – 2:18
Side D
 "Decadent & Symmetrical" – 1:51
 "Mono" – 5:27
 "The Halliwell Hammers (3)" – 3:36
 "Anything That Flies" – 3:09
 "Ended" – 1:14

References

External links
 
 
 Worship the Glitch at Brainwashed
Worship the Glitch promotional site at Internet Archive
Press release

1995 albums
Coil (band) albums